The 1978 Monaco Grand Prix was a Formula One motor race held on 7 May 1978 at Monaco. It was the fifth race of the 1978 World Championship of F1 Drivers and the 1978 International Cup for F1 Constructors.

The 75-lap race was won by Frenchman Patrick Depailler, driving a Tyrrell-Ford. It was Depailler's first Formula One victory in his 69th Grand Prix. Niki Lauda finished second in a Brabham-Alfa Romeo, with Jody Scheckter third in a Wolf-Ford.

Report
Carlos Reutemann started on pole with the Brabham duo of John Watson and Niki Lauda second and third. Watson had a good start and led into the first corner, whereas Reutemann collided with James Hunt and had to pit for repairs, which left Patrick Depailler and Lauda second and third. For the first half of the race, the top three remained the same until Watson had an off allowing Depailler and Lauda through, but the latter then suffered a puncture and had to pit for tyres before charging back up and retaking second from Watson towards the end of the race. At the front, Depailler took his first career victory with Lauda second, and Jody Scheckter third after Watson made another mistake in the final laps. Jean-Pierre Jabouille's 10th-place finish was Renault's first race finish.

Classification

Pre-qualifying classification 

*Positions in red indicate entries that failed to pre-qualify.

Qualifying classification 

*Positions in red indicate entries that failed to qualify.

Race classification

Championship standings after the race

Drivers' Championship standings

Constructors' Championship standings

References

Monaco Grand Prix
Monaco Grand Prix
Grand Prix
Monaco Grand Prix